Torulaspora delbrueckii is a ubiquitous yeast species with both wild and anthropic habitats. The type strain of T. delbrueckii is CBS 1146T, equivalent to CLIB 230 or ATCC 10662, etc.. The type strain of T. delbrueckii CBS 1146 T was sequenced in 2009, and is composed of 8 chromosomes in addition to a mitochondrial genome.

Torulaspora delbrueckii was formerly known as Saccharomyces delbrueckii or Saccharomyces rosei or Saccharomyces roseus, and the anamorph is called Candida colliculosa (for a complete list of synonyms, see CBS's website).

Torulaspora delbrueckii is the most studied species of the genus Torulaspora that comprises 8 species to date, including T. franciscae, T. pretoriensis, T. microellipsoides, T. globosa, T. indica, T. maleeae, and T. quercuum. The taxonomy of the genus Torulaspora is evolving rapidly, and the availability of molecular tools to discriminate Torulaspora species  will help correcting errors in species assignments.

Habitats
Torulaspora delbrueckii is isolated from several human bioprocesses, including the bread industry where some T. delbrueckii strains are commercialized for frozen dough applications. Other applications include food fermentations of silage, cocoa, olive  or cucumber; distilled and traditional fermented beverage production including mescal, colonche, tequila, cider, strawberry tree fruits juice, sugarcane juice  or kefir; dairy products’ fermentations like traditional cheeses  and fermented milk.
Torulaspora delbrueckii can be an opportunistic spoilage yeast for dairy products or soft drinks (fruit juices, etc.).
Torulaspora delbrueckii colonizes several natural environments, ranging from soils, to plants, fruits  and insects. 
T.delbrueckii is occasionally found as a clinical isolate, although not considered to be a human pathogen, a state described as opportunistic pathogen.

Winemaking
Torulaspora delbrueckii has been associated with winemaking for decades  and isolated either from grape, must or wine. Torulaspora delbrueckii is now proposed as starter culture (to be associated with S. cerevisiae in mixed cultures) for certain applications, particularly to reduce volatile acidity in high-sugar fermentations like in Sauternes wines.
Recent findings show that T. delbrueckii species has been domesticated for winemaking and other human uses about 1900 and 4000 years ago respectively.

Life-cycle
The life-cycle of T. delbrueckii remains unclear. Some authors consider T. delbrueckii to be a haploid species, while more recent findings suggest T. delbrueckii have a mostly diploid homothallic life. To date, the life-cycle of the species is not formally elucidated.

References

Saccharomycetaceae
Yeasts used in brewing
Winemaking
Fungi described in 1904